Endel Paap (born 8 September 1938 in Võru Parish, Võru County) is an Estonian politician. He was a member of IX Riigikogu.

He has been a member of Estonian People's Party.

References

Living people
1938 births
Members of the Riigikogu, 1999–2003
People from Võru Parish